This article is about the particular significance of the year 1808 to Wales and its people.

Incumbents
Lord Lieutenant of Anglesey – Henry Paget 
Lord Lieutenant of Brecknockshire and Monmouthshire – Henry Somerset, 6th Duke of Beaufort
Lord Lieutenant of Caernarvonshire – Thomas Bulkeley, 7th Viscount Bulkeley
Lord Lieutenant of Cardiganshire – Thomas Johnes
Lord Lieutenant of Carmarthenshire – George Rice, 3rd Baron Dynevor 
Lord Lieutenant of Denbighshire – Sir Watkin Williams-Wynn, 5th Baronet    
Lord Lieutenant of Flintshire – Robert Grosvenor, 1st Marquess of Westminster 
Lord Lieutenant of Glamorgan – John Stuart, 1st Marquess of Bute 
Lord Lieutenant of Merionethshire - Sir Watkin Williams-Wynn, 5th Baronet
Lord Lieutenant of Montgomeryshire – Edward Clive, 1st Earl of Powis
Lord Lieutenant of Pembrokeshire – Richard Philipps, 1st Baron Milford
Lord Lieutenant of Radnorshire – George Rodney, 3rd Baron Rodney

Bishop of Bangor – John Randolph
Bishop of Llandaff – Richard Watson
Bishop of St Asaph – William Cleaver 
Bishop of St Davids – Thomas Burgess

Events

5 January - The first issue of The North Wales Gazette is printed at Bangor.
20 September - The White Book of Hergest is destroyed in a fire at Covent Garden.
30 October - William Lort Mansel is consecrated Bishop of Bristol.
19 November - The naval frigate HMS Owen Glendower is launched.
date unknown
Construction of the Horseshoe Falls on the River Dee by Thomas Telford.
The publishing house Gwasg Gee is founded.
St Katherine's Church, Milford Haven, built by Charles Francis Greville, is consecrated.
Benjamin Hall is given the Abercarn estate by his father-in-law, Richard Crawshay.
The Ruabon Brook Tramway is extended from Acrefair to the Plas Madoc Colliery in Plasbennion. 
Twelve-year-old Charles Nice Davies goes to serve in India as an ensign.

Arts and literature

New books

English language
Felicia Hemans - Juvenile Poems

Welsh language
Robert Davies (Bardd Nantglyn) - Ieithiadur neu Ramadeg Cymraeg
Thomas Edwards (Twm o'r Nant) - Bannau y Byd  
Titus Lewis - Llyfr Rhyfeddodau

Music
Hymnau o Fawl i Dduw a'r Oen (hymns by Ann Griffiths, posthumously published)

Births 
30 January - Sir John Henry Scourfield, author (died 1876)
6 March - William Williams (Carw Coch), man of letters and eisteddfodwr (died 1872)
13 May - Thomas Aubrey, Wesleyan leader (died 1867)
date unknown 
Dic Penderyn, labourer executed for his part in the Merthyr Rising (died 1831)
William Roos, artist and engraver (died 1878)

Deaths
21 January – Richard Pennant, 1st Baron Penrhyn, about 70
12 February – Anna Maria Bennett, novelist, about 70
12 September – Charles Herbert, Royal Navy officer, son of the Earl of Carnarvon, 34 (drowned)
30 November – Watkin Williams, politician, 66?
28 December – Griffith Roberts, physician and collector of manuscripts, 73

References

 
Wales